Never Love You Enough is the fifth studio album by American country music artist Chely Wright. It was released on September 25, 2001 via MCA Nashville, and was her last album for the label.

Content
Its first two tracks — the title track and "Jezebel" — were both released as singles, both peaking in the mid-20s on the Billboard country charts. The latter was co-written by Jay DeMarcus, bass guitarist for the group Rascal Flatts. Trisha Yearwood sings background vocals on the track "Wouldn't It Be Cool" and Phil Vassar on "For the Long Run". Brad Paisley contributed background vocals for "Not as in Love" and "One Night in Las Vegas."

Critical reception

Michael Galluci of Allmusic rated the album 2 stars out of 5, saying that "This more conservative follow-up finds her back on the farm, still tracking the ins and outs of love, but accompanied by a shrugging indifference." Eli Messinger of Country Standard Time gave the album a mixed review, saying that "Folksiness has given way to the chart-friendly crossover material and arena-styled power-ballads that continue to reign on her latest." and "The centrist, traditional messages may connect with listeners, but they won't push anyone's buttons or boundaries… This is a pleasant pop album, but hardly the sort of truly memorable work that Wright is so obviously capable of."

Track listing

Personnel
Compiled from liner notes.

Musicians

Never Love You Enough
 Mike Brignardello – bass guitar
 Lisa Cochran – background vocals
 Dann Huff – electric guitar
 Mike Johnson – steel guitar
 B. James Lowry – acoustic guitar
 Chris McHugh – drums
 Jerry McPherson – electric guitar
 Steve Nathan – keyboards
 Chris Rodriguez – background vocals
 Chely Wright – lead vocals

Jezebel
 Barry Bales – background vocals
 J. T. Corenflos – electric guitar
 Stuart Duncan – fiddle
 Wes Hightower – background vocals
 John Hobbs – piano, Hammond B-3 organ
 David Huff – programming
 Marcus Hummon – acoustic guitar, background vocals
 Troy Johnson – background vocals
 Paul Leim – drums
 Michael Rhodes – bass guitar
 Darrell Scott – acoustic guitar, banjo, mandolin, background vocals
 Dan Tyminski – background vocals
 Chely Wright – lead vocals, background vocals

One Night in Las Vegas
 Jim "Moose" Brown – piano, keyboards, strings
 Kevin "Swine" Grantt – bass guitar
 Wes Hightower – background vocals
 Mike Johnson – steel guitar
 Troy Johnson – background vocals
 Mitch McMichen – percussion
 Brad Paisley – acoustic guitar, electric guitar, background vocals
 Ben Sesar – drums
 Justin Williamson – fiddle, mandolin
 Chely Wright – lead vocals

While I Was Waiting
 Chad Cromwell – drums
 Eric Darken – percussion
 Dan Dugmore – steel guitar
 Stuart Duncan – mandolin
 Steve Gibson – electric guitar
 Wes Hightower – background vocals
 John Hobbs – keyboards
 Liana Manis – background vocals
 Matt Rollings – keyboards
 John Willis – acoustic guitar
 Glenn Worf – bass guitar
 Chely Wright – lead vocals

What If We Fly
 J.T. Corenflos – electric guitar
 Stuart Duncan – fiddle
 Paul Franklin – steel guitar
 Wes Hightower – background vocals
 John Hobbs – piano
 David Huff – programming
 Marcus Hummon – acoustic guitar
 Troy Johnson – background vocals
 Paul Leim – drums
 Michael Rhodes – bass guitar
 Darrell Scott – acoustic guitar
 Paul Worley – electric guitar
 Chely Wright – lead vocals

Wouldn't It Be Cool
 Pat Buchanan – electric guitar
 Melonie Cannon – background vocals
 Chad Cromwell – drums
 Eric Darken – percussion
 Dan Dugmore – 12-string guitar electric guitar
 Stuart Duncan – fiddle
 Steve Gibson – electric guitar
 John Hobbs – piano
 Garnet Imes – background vocals
 Matt Rollings – keyboards
 John Willis – acoustic guitar
 Glenn Worf – bass guitar
 Chely Wright – lead vocals
 Trisha Yearwood – background vocals

Her
 Chad Cromwell – drums
 Eric Darken – percussion
 Dan Dugmore – steel guitar
 Stuart Duncan – fiddle
 Steve Gibson – electric guitar
 Wes Hightower – background vocals
 John Hobbs – keyboards
 Nashville String Machine – strings
 Matt Rollings – keyboards
 John Willis – acoustic guitar
 Glenn Worf – bass guitar
 Chely Wright – lead vocals

Love Didn't Listen
 Chad Cromwell – drums
 Eric Darken – percussion
 Dan Dugmore – steel guitar
 Larry Franklin – fiddle
 Steve Gibson – acoustic guitar
 Wes Hightower – background vocals
 John Hobbs – piano
 John Jorgenson – electric guitar
 Wendell Mobley – background vocals
 Steve Nathan – Hammond B-3 organ
 Glenn Worf – bass guitar
 Chely Wright – lead vocals

For the Long Run
 Chad Cromwell – drums
 Dan Dugmore – steel guitar
 Larry Franklin – fiddle
 Steve Gibson – electric guitar
 Wes Hightower – background vocals
 John Barlow Jarvis – keyboards
 John Jorgenson – electric guitar
 Liana Manis – background vocals
 Nashville String Machine – strings
 Steve Nathan – keyboards
 Phil Vassar – background vocals
 John Willis – acoustic guitar
 Glenn Worf – bass guitar
 Chely Wright – lead vocals

Horoscope
 Jim "Moose" Brown – piano, Hammond B-3 organ
 Shannon Brown – background vocals
 Kevin "Swine" Grantt – bass guitar
 Wes Hightower – background vocals
 Mike Johnson – steel guitar
 Troy Johnson – background vocals
 Kendal Marcy – background vocals
 Kris Marcy – background vocals
 Mitch McMichen – percussion
 Brad Paisley – acoustic guitar, electric guitar, resophonic guitar
 Ben Sesar – drums
 Justin Williamson – fiddle, mandolin
 Chely Wright – lead vocals, background vocals

Not as In Love
 Chad Cromwell – drums
 Dan Dugmore – steel guitar
 Larry Franklin – fiddle
 Steve Gibson – electric guitar
 Wes Hightower – background vocals
 John Barlow Jarvis – piano
 John Jorgenson – acoustic guitar, mandocello
 Nashville String Machine – strings
 Steve Nathan – keyboards
 Brad Paisley – background vocals
 Glenn Worf – bass guitar
 Chely Wright – lead vocals

Deep Down Low
 Chad Cromwell – drums
 Eric Darken – percussion
 Chip Davis – background vocals
 Dan Dugmore – steel guitar
 Larry Franklin – fiddle
 Steve Gibson – acoustic guitar
 John Hobbs – piano
 John Jorgenson – electric guitar
 Steve Nathan – Hammond B-3 organ
 Glenn Worf – bass guitar
 Chely Wright – lead vocals

Charts

Weekly charts

Year-end charts

References

2001 albums
MCA Records albums
Chely Wright albums